Trisha's Southern Kitchen is an American cooking television series that airs on Food Network. It is presented by singer and chef Trisha Yearwood; and the series features Yearwood cooking southern-inspired meals for her family and friends.

Trisha's Southern Kitchen officially premiered on April 14, 2012. In 2013, the series won a Daytime Emmy Award (along with fellow Food Network series The Best Thing I Ever Made) for Outstanding Culinary Program.

Episodes

Awards and nominations

References

External links
 
 

2010s American cooking television series
2012 American television series debuts
Daytime Emmy Award for Outstanding Culinary Program winners
English-language television shows
Food Network original programming
Food reality television series
Television series by Relativity Media
Television shows filmed in Tennessee